Badri Alkhazashvili (born 31 July 1995) is a Georgian rugby union player. His position is hooker, and he currently plays for Lyon in the Top 14 and the Georgia national rugby union team.

References

1995 births
Living people
Rugby union players from Tbilisi
Rugby union players from Georgia (country)
Georgia international rugby union players
Rugby union hookers
Expatriate sportspeople from Georgia (country) in France
Expatriate rugby union players in France
RC Toulonnais players
Expatriate rugby union players from Georgia (country)
CA Brive players
Provence Rugby players
Lyon OU players